Durgapur is a village located in Angul district, in the Indian state of Odisha.

The village is well known from the British colonial era by extracting the good will of "Late Uchhab Chandra Pradhan". It offers dense forest, small hills and traditional Odia culture with several festivals. The main attractions of the village are several temples such as goddess Aparajita Maa Durga temple on Mathamundia Hill, Radha Krishna temple at Pradhan Sahi, Hari-Hara temple and village deity Buddhi Thakurani temple near Charibati Chhak. The village is thirty two kms from the district headquarters Angul. NH-55 is 5 kms away from the village at Jarapada. Bakala, Korada, Bhagirathipur and Jarapada are adjacent villages to Durgapur.

Village institutions include a Post Office, Grama Panchayat Office, Doordarshan relay center,  Schools, Auxiliary(Sub) health center, Veterinary assistant center, Neelachal Gramya Bank and MINI/AUCC Bank . Minor Irrigation Project Jamaijharan at the foot of the Mathamundia Hill and large pond Gangamunda irrigate the farm-lands of village. A Daka-Bangala from British time is now abolished in the village. The Radha Krishna temple from the colonial era and various folk based cultures have lost its influence now. Mobile and DTH services include Doordarshan, BSNL, Airtel, Jio and Vodafone-Idea etc, which are saving the village from its interior feeling.

The village is surrounded by forests, small hills and shows the feel of illusion like a valley. It is situated almost in the middle of the district Angul.

Balakrushna Marga(Hawak Road of British time)which is 25 kms in length; that connects from Jarapada to Chhendipada-block and runs through the village. The village comes under Chhendipada Tahasil and Jarapada RI Circle.

The forests are managed by two committees, including 'Maa Durga Bana Sarankhyana Samiti' and provide wood-fuel for the village. The Range office of Durgapur Forest Division, has its working office at Jarapada.

CONTENT:

 Demographics
 Education
 Health
 Politics
 Culture
 Economy

 

1) Demographics:

The population of the village is around 4500 including 3243 voters(male & female), children and youth mass of below eighteen ages within it. According to "Gram Panchayat Election 2022" there are 3243 voters in the village; including 1677 male voters and 1566 female voters to saturate the population.

2) Education:

Improper schooling and sanitation for long times in the past caused bad literacy and bad health conditions to the villagers. It has overcome some-how through the local schools like Durgapur Nodal U. P. School, Tangirisahi U. P. School, Panasahi U. P. School, Bana Durga Pada U. P. School, Durgapur G. P. High School (5T High School) and some Anganwadi centers within the village, and as well as the nearest college 'Patitapabana Mahavidyalaya' at Jarapada.

3) Health:

Due to lack of a permanent site for an ANM center in the past; it had resulted in an overall low level health of the villagers. But due to communication through private vehicles to the nearest city Angul and by implementation of some government initiatives now the problem has overcome in many parts.

4) Politics:

The village comes within Assembly constituency Chhendipada (62) and Parliamentary(Lok-Sabha) Constituency Sambalpur (03). The three major political parties are Indian National Congress, Bharatiya Janata Party (BJP) and Biju Janata Dal (BJD) (regional party of Odisha). Congress was in control for decades, followed by a shorter run for BJP, in turn followed by BJD. The Communist-supported SUCI party has a small role in nearby industrial areas. Poor education limits development. According to "Gram Panchayat Election 2022" there are 3243 voters in the village; including 1677 male voters and 1566 female voters

5) Culture:
Odias have "thirteen festivals in twelve months". Festivals include Bhadraba(Grama) Puja, Dusshera(Durga) Puja, Dhabaleswar Puja(Bada Osha), Panchuka and Kartik Poornima, Shivaratri, Dola(Phalguna) Yatra and Chandan Yatra. Other Oriya religious festivals like Pana Sankranti(Hanumana Jayanti), Akshyaya Trutiya(Mutthi Anukula), Raja Parba, Rakhi Purnima, Khudurukuni Osha, Shree Ganesh(Vinayaka) Chaturthi, Garvana Sankranti, Kumara Purnima, Deepavali(Diwali), Prathamastami, Manabasa(Mahalaxmi) Gurubara, Pausa Purnima, Makara Sankranti, Saraswati Puja, Holi and Basantika Durga Puja are observed ordinarily and serially according to the Oriya months. 
Pakhala made from boiled rice with few vegetable and/or non-vegetable items are the daily food habit of the village people. Local cakes like chakuli-pitha, poda-pitha, kakara-pitha, manda-pitha, arisha-pitha, enduri-pitha, tala-bara are favourite foods at the time of festivals and celebrations. These pakhala-meals and local-cakes are so favourite to abide with the Odia-food-culture

6) Economy:
Agriculture and vegetable production is the main profession/livelihood of the village. Bullocks are the primary means of ploughing with tractor form of cultivation increasing gradually. Most plots are too small to cultivate by machines. "CHASA" including the titles Pradhan, Sahu, Behera etc creates the "Farmer-Caste-System" of the village. In earlier times, the farmers sang folk songs while ploughing, but this is no longer common.

Durgapur is a village located in Angul district, in the Indian state of Odisha.

References 

Villages in Angul district